Averipally is a group of hamlets located 6 km away from Thally town in Krishnagiri district, Tamil Nadu, India. This village comes under Achubalu Panchayat within Denkanikottai taluk. Periya Averipalli, Chinna Averipalli and Averipalli Agaraharam are the 3 sub-hamlets forms Averipally as a Village. This village located 3 km away from Karnataka State Border so apart from Tamil language Kannada also widely spoken in this village.

See also
Denkanikottai taluk
Thally

References

Villages in Krishnagiri district